Pureza (Spanish, Portuguese "Purity") may refer to:

Geography
Pureza station a station on the Manila Light Rail Transit System Line 2 (Line 2)
Pureza Street a short street located in Santa Mesa district in Manila, Philippines
Pureza, Rio Grande do Norte a municipality in the state of Rio Grande do Norte in the Northeast region of Brazil

Other
Pureza (novel), a 1937 novel byJosé Lins do Rego
Pureza, a 1940 film based on the novel
Pureza, a character in The Adventures of Pureza: Queen of the Riles, a 2011 Filipino comedy film